John Horvath may refer to:

 John Horvath (doctor), Chief Medical Officer of Australia between 2003 and 2009
 John Horvath (mathematician), Hungarian-American mathematician noted for his contributions to analysis